The Kamwe 
Kamwe also spelt Kamue) is a Chadic language autochthonous to Adamawa State, Borno State of Nigeria and North Western Cameroon.
In Nigeria about 80 percent of the Kamwe people are found in Michika Local Government Area of Adamawa State, Nigeria. They are also found in Mubi North, Hong, Gombi, Song and Madagali local governments in Adamawa State. The Kamwe people are also found in Borno State, especially in Askira/Uba and Gwoza local government areas
Blench (2019) lists Mukta of Mukta village, Adamawa State as part of the Kamwe cluster.
 
Kamwe is a compound word derived from the words "Ka" and "Mwe" Which means "People of". Kamwe stands for people of the same consanguinity and affinity. It means family kindred. Relatives bound together. It derived its meaning from a special type of native Kamwe ornament worn by close relatives of a deceased person as a mark of identity and empathy.
According to Kamwe elders the "Mwe" is the mark of true identity of relatives in Kamweland. In the past, if a non-relative wears the Mwe, it can leads to conflict with the real relatives. Only close relatives are allowed to wear the Mwe. Because the "Mwe" is the true identity of close relatives and cements the bond between them. Those wearing the Mwe will hug themselves saying "Tselie ra na". (Your are my relative.) Some elders still opine that the Kamwe means people of the heavens, people on the hills, mountains and even the sky in Vecemwe. There are more than 24 dialects of Vecemwe (Kamwe language) but Nkafa is the central dialect and is reduced into writing and literature.
The Kamwe people and language were called Higi (Higgi) in the past. Kamwe elders say "Higgi" is a derogatory word and is an insult (Ngelai in Vecemwe) and a derogatory word coined from "hagyi" grasshopper and scornfully tagged on the Kamwe by their neighbours the Margi, that literally means "grasshopper" to mock the Kamwe in the past. Majority of the Kamwe people despise the derogatory word 'Higgi' except some few people in Dakwa (Bazza) area who are originally of Margi origin. Because grasshopper from which the derogatory word "higgi" is derived is a hopeless insect in Kamwe culture eaten by lizards and frogs because they are weak and vulnerable. The Margi first called the Kamwe people "Higi" in 1937.

Heritage of settlement 
Kamwe people are the indigenous settlers of the Michikan local government that was established in 1976. Kwada Kwakaa, A great lion and leopard hunter was regarded as the founder of the settlement. The settlement was named after his creeping method of hunting animals on the hill. In kamwe language, Mwe” means heaven or hills while “Ci-ka” means creep. Which was later mispronounced by the colonialist as Michika.

Traditional Governance 
The Traditional ruler is called Mbege Kamwe who is also the leader of the Kamwe people is Ngida Zakawa Kwache

Language 
The Kamwe people speak Vecemwe Kamwe language.

References 

Ethnic groups in Nigeria
Adamawa State
Adamawa Region